Goro Majima (Japanese: 真島 吾朗, Hepburn: Majima Gorō) is a major recurring character in Sega's Like a Dragon video game series, previously known as Yakuza outside of Japan. He is one of the main playable protagonists of Yakuza 0 and Yakuza: Dead Souls, as well as the Majima Saga of Yakuza Kiwami 2. Introduced as a member of the Tojo Clan and patriarch of its subsidiary group, the Majima Family as well as second-in-command of the Shimano Family, nicknamed "Mad Dog of Shimano", he develops a sadomasochistic obsession with the protagonist Kazuma Kiryu. He is seeking continually to fight him, seeing him as the perfect rival, but eventually, bonds with him across the franchise and becomes an important ally of his. He is also the sworn brother of Taiga Saejima who is one of the protagonists of Yakuza 4 and Yakuza 5. Majima's character is explored in more detail during the prequel Yakuza 0, in which he is a 24-year-old former Yakuza and a playable protagonist along with Kiryu. In this game, Majima has a much calmer and serious demeanor that develops into his standard sadomasochistic one during a war between a number of families in a fight for a patch of land known as the Empty Lot. Majima also appears in the spin-off Dead Souls as well as the crossover Project X Zone 2.

The Ryu Ga Gotoku Studio created Majima as a "clown" character who would contrast his calmer characterization in Yakuza 0, where the localization shifted Majima's character arc so he would not come across as insane. Majima has been popular with the Yakuza fanbase, having earned a CD with all the songs Ugaki plays in his karaoke mini-games while topping a popularity poll. His character and fighting style in Yakuza 0 were highly praised by critics.

Creation and development
According to Scott Strichart, who handled localization and production on a number of Yakuza  games, Majima is a bit of a "class clown"—someone with a "joker-esque personality"—which is opposite to his calm demeanor in the prequel. However, he noted that while fans felt that Majima went "insane", the Ryu Ga Gotoku Studio said that he "makes a conscious choice to... let loose". This was something the translators found challenging while localizing the game. Strichart pointed out that through Majima's interactions with Nishitani, he gains insight into how someone like that would live. The goal of the localization team was to make Majima and Kiryu more likeable with their changes, although Strichart believed Kiryu was more popular than Majima in Western countries. Strichart said that while fans might miss previous Yakuza characters like Kiryu and Majima, he hoped they would be receptive to Takayuki Yagami, the protagonist from the next game Judgment.

Series' producer Daisuke Sato said that ever since the release of Yakuza 0, Majima has become far more popular, to the point that many developers thought it was possible to create a new spin-off game focused around him.

Appearances
Goro Majima first appears in the original Yakuza game as a supporting character, head of the Majima Family and a lieutenant of Futoshi Shimano. Nicknamed "The Mad Dog of Shimano" (嶋野の狂犬, Shimano no kyōken), he takes an interest in protagonist Kazuma Kiryu because Kiryu refuses to fight him when provoked. This results in Majima spending the rest of the game's plot trying to goad Kiryu into fighting him just for fun. To achieve this, Majima attacks Kiryu while he is escaping from Chairman Sera's funeral; kidnaps Haruka, daughter of Kiryu's love interest Yumi Sawamura; and drives a truck into a soapland when Kiryu was questioning one of the sex workers for information. The remake of the game, Yakuza Kiwami, added further scenes where Majima stalks Kiryu, aiming to make his rival stronger through new fights.

During Yakuza 2—and its later remake, Yakuza Kiwami 2—Majima appears again. In between the events of the first and second games, Majima left the Tojo Clan because of disagreements with its new leader, Chairman Yukio Terada. He then formed his own criminal organization, the Majima Construction Company, which ran several construction rackets, along with an underground fighting arena and an illegal casino. Because of the looming threat of an invasion of Tokyo by the rival Yakuza organization, the Omi Alliance, Kiryu convinces Majima to ally with the Tojo Clan once again and provide the Majima Construction Company's support if a war breaks out. Though initially hesitant, Majima ultimately agrees after Kiryu beats him in a fight in his underground coliseum. Majima's crew ultimately prove instrumental in defending Tokyo against Omi attacks. Majima helps save the city when he disarms the bombs planted all over Kamurocho by another rival crime syndicate, the Korean Jingweon Mafia.

During Yakuza 3, Kiryu pleads with Majima once more to go back to the Tojo Clan and support the newly appointed Sixth Chairman, Daigo Dojima, as a contingency against any future troubles. Sometime later, Majima is blackmailed by Goh Hamazaki as a suspect in the clan's internal dispute. 

In Yakuza 4, Majima follows the trail of Yasuko Saejima, determined to protect her on behalf of Taiga Saejima. Majima tells Shun Akiyama of Sky Finance that he is looking for Yasuko to protect her and to make amends with Saejima. On his way to see Majima, Kiryu, having returned to Kamurocho, witnesses Majima's arrest and calls out to him. Majima tells him that it was Daigo Dojima who set him up. 

In Yakuza 5, Majima is in negotiations with the Tsukimino branch of the Omi Alliance under Dojima's orders to help put a stop to the rising tensions between the two clans. Despite his claims he wants peace, Tsubasa Kurosawa orders assassins to kill Majima mid-negotiation, which he survives, but is kidnapped. Majima reveals that the reason he was unable to resist Kurosawa was the threat to Haruka at her debut concert as an idol.

The prequel Yakuza 0 provides additional backstory for Majima, presenting a different and much more controlled version of the character years prior to his first appearance. It is revealed that he was thrown out of the Shimano Family for attempting to aid his sworn brother Saejima in an attack on the Ueno Seiwa Clan, which landed the latter in prison with the death penalty. Majima was tortured for a year and his left eye gouged out, after which he was handed over to Shimano's sworn brother Tsukasa Sagawa in the Omi Alliance. Sagawa forces Majima to manage the Cabaret Grand in Sotenbori, Osaka, where he is nicknamed by the locals the "Lord of the Night" due to his managerial acumen and proven success in turning the club's fortunes around. Wishing to return to his yakuza roots, Majima gets the opportunity to make a comeback by killing a woman known as Makoto Makimura. However, he accidentally bonds with Makimura and is unable to kill her. Working to protect her, he learns that Makimura is caught up in the dispute for the "Empty Lot," a piece of real estate in Kamurocho sought by members of the Tojo Clan and Omi Alliance for its importance in a hugely valuable real estate deal. Majima manages to protect Makimura and rejoins the Shimano Family, but he distances himself from her as he returns to his yakuza life, hoping Makimura enjoys a peaceful life instead. Additionally, Majima decides to develop his infamous sadomasochistic persona based on the many eccentric men he encountered in his quest, to rise above the world that mistreated him and meets Kiryu for the first time at the end of the game. 

Majima later reunites with Makimura in the remake of Yakuza 2, where Makimura has formed a family. During a conflict within the Tojo Clan, Majima decides to leave the Tojo, and creates his construction company, Majima Construction, taking over Purgatory and beginning work on Kamurocho Hills. 

Majima also appears in Yakuza 6: The Song of Life as a minor character, and reappears as a major character and summonable ally alongside Saejima in Yakuza: Like a Dragon.

Spinoffs and other appearances
Outside of the main Yakuza series, Majima is playable in Yakuza: Dead Souls, fighting against an army of zombies. Majima's avatar is used in Ryū ga Gotoku Ishin! for the samurai Okita Sōji. He also appears alongside Kiryu in the crossover game Project X Zone 2 as well as Binary Domain.

In the film Like a Dragon, an adaptation of the first game, he is portrayed by Goro Kishitani. In the Ryu ga Gotoku stage play, he is portrayed by Shunsuke Kubozuka.

The 2019 adventure game Later Alligator features a character named "The Knife" who resembles Majima and makes several references to the Yakuza series.

Reception
Goro Majima has been popular with the Yakuza fanbase. His songs performed during his appearances were collected in 2017 on a CD titled Goro Majima's Best Hits. In a 2018 popularity poll, Majima was voted the most popular Yakuza character. GameInformer also listed him as the best main character in 2017 based on his characterization from Yakuza 0. Several writers enjoyed the character's fighting style in Yakuza 0, finding him more interesting than Kiryu. EGMNOW liked the contrast the duo had in the narrative because of the different quests they had to pass to achieve their goals. GameSpot highly praised Majima's character arc in that game for changing into the narrative, as well as how many allies and enemies he makes. Similarly, IGN liked the handling of Majima's and Kiryu's storylines, finding them simple in contrast to the ones in Yakuza 5, which the website deemed convoluted. Polygon stated that Majima was quite different from his portrayal in the regular games in the series because his story was set in the past. A similar comment was made by PlayStation Life Style because both Majima and Kiryu change across the plot of this prequel. The Jimquisition said that both characters were "like-able protagonists who consistently have to act as straight men in a variety of weird situations".

Destructoid enjoyed the comical characterization in Yakuza Kiwami because of his constant interactions with Kiryu. Game Informer noted despite not being playable with his longer screen time Majima manages to aid the player to make Kiryu a stronger fighter. However, they were highly critical of his different personality in Kiwami, calling it "jarring", and added that Yakuza 0 failed to close this character arc. While calling him "Zero's standout character", GameSpot stated that they enjoyed these interactions, as it added more side content to the remake of the first game. IGN referred to this take of Majima as "lovably weird" based on his traits. Polygon criticized Majima's fights for lacking the challenge seen in regular boss fights. They added that "Majima's constant intervention feels a little more ingrained in the story, providing some character depth that the original game lacked."

With Yakuza Kiwami 2, Destructoid criticized Majima's "overpowered" abilities, which players continuously pressed the same buttons to use them. Game Informer praised Majima's story in this game, as it helped to develop his change of character from Yakuza 0 further, while also finding his mini game refreshing because of how different it is from common regular fights. Game Revolution agreed, finding Majima's interactions with Makoto during his own side story provides further depth to the "fan favorite" character. Despite liking the character, GameSpot criticized him for lacking his own character progression during his chapters. IGN had similar comments with regard to his character's depth but found his scenario to be relatively short.

References

Further reading

Action-adventure game characters
Fictional Japanese people in video games
Fictional businesspeople in video games
Fictional characters missing an eye
Fictional crime bosses
Fictional criminals in video games
Fictional cross-dressers
Fictional knife-fighters
Fictional male martial artists
Fictional managers
Fictional martial artists in video games
Fictional yakuza
Male characters in video games
Sega antagonists
Sega protagonists
Video game bosses
Video game characters introduced in 2005
Yakuza (franchise)